James Turner Butler (April 27, 1882 – September 29, 1969) was an American politician in the state of Florida. He served in the Florida House of Representatives and Florida Senate, including as President of the Florida Senate as a Democrat.

Career
Butler served in the Florida House of Representatives from 1911 to 1913 as a member from Duval County. He served in the Florida Senate from 1918 to 1925 and from 1931 to 1941, and was its president from 1939 to 1941. In 1939 he served as President of the Florida Senate.

A lawyer, he resided in Jacksonville, Florida; the J. Turner Butler Boulevard there is named in his honor.

References

Members of the Florida House of Representatives
1882 births
1969 deaths
20th-century American politicians